Xianglong Luohan, also known as the Taming Dragon Arhat, is an arhat and one of the Eighteen Arhats in China. His Sanskrit name is Nantimitolo and origins are said to derive from a Buddhist monk Mahākāśyapa. The legendary Chan Buddhist monk Ji Gong, was widely recognised by people as the incarnate of the Xianglong Luohan.

Origin

Originally there were only sixteen arhats. Worship of a group of sixteen arhats was set forth in an Indian sutra that was translated into Chinese in the mid-seventh century. Between the late Tang dynasty and early Five Dynasties and Ten Kingdoms period of China, two additional arhats were added, one paired with a tiger and the other one with a dragon. 

Xianglong Luohan is often equated with Mahākāśyapa of Buddhism, but actually, Xianglong Luohan has his own number of stories and has long been worshipped in China.

Legend

According to legend, the people of a kingdom in ancient India, after being incited by a demon, went on a rampage against the Buddhists and monasteries, stealing the Buddhist scriptures. The Dragon King flooded the kingdom and rescued the scriptures, which he put in his Dragon Palace.

After the Dragon King was tamed by Nantimitolo, who was a disciple of Gautama Buddha, the scriptures were retrieved back to earth. Hence he is called the Taming Dragon Louhan.

In popular culture
Xianglong Luohan has been portrayed as Ji Gong in many films and television series.
 Xianglong Luohan, a 1984 Taiwanese television series produced by CTV, starring Hsu Pu-liao.

Gallery

References

Buddhism in China